Theo Gries (born 10 February 1961 in Mittelbrunn) is a German football manager and retired player who is currently coaching 1. FC Union Berlin II. Gries scored 123 goals in the 2. Bundesliga, making him before the start of the 2012-13 second division season the third-best marksman in the history of this league.

References

External links 
 

1961 births
Living people
People from Kaiserslautern (district)
German footballers
Association football midfielders
Bundesliga players
2. Bundesliga players
1. FC Kaiserslautern players
Alemannia Aachen players
Hertha BSC players
Hannover 96 players
German football managers
Tennis Borussia Berlin managers
Footballers from Rhineland-Palatinate
1. FC Union Berlin non-playing staff